Carl Nils Gunnar William Aschan (6 May 1906 – 27 July 2008) was a Swedish-born British intelligence officer and spy during World War II.

Born at Örebro, Sweden, Aschan was the son of a Swedish judge who was also chief of police at Örebro; Carl's mother, Baroness Elsa Djurklou, was the daughter of Baron Nils Gabriel Djurklou. Around 1916 or 1917, his parents divorced, and his moved with his mother to Stockholm. Several years later, they moved to London, where he was educated at local schools and by a private tutor.

Aschan later helped to track down some of Adolf Hitler's associates following the defeat of Nazi Germany.

References

1906 births
2008 deaths
World War II spies for the United Kingdom
People from Stockholm
Swedish emigrants to the United Kingdom
Swedish people of World War II
British centenarians
Men centenarians

People from Örebro